Ceratolobus was a dioecious genus of flowering plants in the palm family found in Southeast Asia, commonly called rotan. Its species are now included within the genus Calamus. They are only differentiated from close relatives like Korthalsia, Calamus, and Daemonorops by leaf sheath appendages or inflorescence variations.  The Greek genus name combines "horn" and "capsule".

Description
Among rattans they are relatively delicate and vinelike, very spiny and densely clustering, stems eventually becoming bare and covered in leaf scars.  The leaves, rachises, and petioles (when present) may be equipped with simple climbing adaptations like barbs, cirrus, and grapnel spines but the climbing habit mostly relies on stem spines, and their leaning, sprawling nature.

With the most reduced inflorescence in the Calaminae, the large panicle remains enclosed within a tough, woody, occasionally armed bract.  Nearing antithesis the beaked end develops splits, exposing the flowers; the bract usually remains persistent, later developing another longitudinal split in fruit, or rarely falling away.  Pistillate and staminate members are indistinguishable without opening the protective prophyll.  The former is branched to two orders, the latter to three; male flowers are borne distant and solitary, female's are larger and develop next to similar, but distorted, sterile male flowers.  The globose or egg-shaped fruit is scaly and has one seed.

Distribution and habitat
Not found above 1000 m, they are found in Thailand, Sumatra, Borneo, Java and the Malay peninsula.  In all cases they form dense thickets, occupying hilly or low land rain forest or in the case of C. subangulatus, in Sarawak, heath forest.  Their low quality and spininess limits cultivation and use.

References

External links
Ceratolobus on NPGS/GRIN
GBIF portal
Fairchild Guide to Palms: Ceratolobus

Calamoideae
Arecaceae genera
Dioecious plants